Blake Willard Nordstrom (October 4, 1960 – January 2, 2019) was an American businessman. The great-grandson of John W. Nordstrom, he served as sole President of the Nordstrom department store chain from 2000 to 2014, and then co-president with his brothers, Peter, and Erik Nordstrom, from 2015 until his death in 2019.

He was a former director of the Federal Reserve Bank of San Francisco. A graduate of the University of Washington, he married Molly A. Lewis in 1988 with whom he had two children.

Nordstrom died on January 2, 2019, after being diagnosed with lymphoma.

References

External links
 

1960 births
2019 deaths
Businesspeople from Seattle
John W.
University of Washington alumni
Federal Reserve Bank people
20th-century American businesspeople
Deaths from lymphoma
Deaths from cancer in Washington (state)